The Priestly Fraternity of Saint Peter (FSSP) is a traditionalist Catholic society of apostolic life for priests and seminarians which is in communion with the Holy See.

The society was founded in 1988 under the leadership of 12 priests who were formerly members of the Society of Saint Pius X (SSPX), another traditionalist organization, but were unwilling to remain part of it following the Écône consecrations, which resulted in its bishops being excommunicated by the Holy See.

Headquartered in Switzerland, the society maintains two international seminaries: the International Seminary of St. Peter in Wigratzbad-Opfenbach, Bavaria, Germany, and Our Lady of Guadalupe Seminary in Denton, Nebraska, United States. The society is officially recognized by the Holy See and its priests celebrate the Tridentine Mass in locations in 147 worldwide dioceses.

Canonical status
According to canon law, the FSSP is a clerical society of apostolic life of pontifical right. It is not, therefore, an institute of consecrated life and members take no religious vows, but are instead bound by the same general laws of celibacy and obedience as diocesan clergy and, in addition, swear an oath as members of the society. The fraternity's pontifical-right status means that it has been established by the Pope and is answerable only to him in terms of its operation (through the Dicastery for Institutes of Consecrated Life and Societies of Apostolic Life; prior to January 17, 2019, through the Pontifical Commission Ecclesia Dei), rather than to local bishops. A local bishop still governs the fraternity's work within his respective diocese. In this sense its organization and administrative reporting status are similar to those of religious orders of pontifical right (for example, the Jesuits or Dominicans).

Mission and charism

The FSSP consists of priests and seminarians who intend to pursue the goal of Christian perfection according to a specific charism, which is to offer the Mass and other sacraments according to the Roman Rite as it existed before the liturgical reforms that followed the Second Vatican Council. Thus, the fraternity uses the Roman Missal, the Roman Breviary, the Pontifical (Pontificale Romanum), and the Roman Ritual in use in 1962, the last editions before the revisions that followed the Council.

The 2007 motu proprio Summorum Pontificum had authorized use of the 1962 Roman Missal by all Latin Church priests as an extraordinary form of the Roman Rite without limit when celebrating Mass "without a congregation". Its use for Mass with a congregation was allowed with the permission of the priest in charge of a church for stable groups attached to this earlier form of the Roman Rite, provided that the priest using it was "qualified to do so and not juridically impeded" (as for instance by suspension). That was abrogated by the 2021 motu proprio Traditionis custodes that emphasized deference towards the Missal of Pope St. Paul VI and added restrictions to which clergy could perform the Roman Rite according to the pre-Vatican II form.  In February 2022, Pope Francis confirmed that the FSSP could continue to celebrate the Latin Mass "in their own churches or oratories[.]"

Following from its charism, the fraternity's mission is twofold: to sanctify each priest through the exercise of his priestly function, and to deploy these priests to parishes. As such, they are to celebrate the sacraments, catechise, preach retreats, organize pilgrimages, and generally provide a full sacramental and cultural life for lay Catholics who are likewise drawn to the rituals of the 1962 missal. In order to help complete its mission, the fraternity has built its own seminaries with the goal of forming men to serve the fraternity.

Founding

The FSSP was established on July 18, 1988, at the Abbey of Hauterive, Switzerland, by twelve priests and twenty seminarians, led by Josef Bisig, all of whom had formerly belonged to Archbishop Marcel Lefebvre's Society of Saint Pius X; they were unwilling to follow that movement into what the Congregation for Bishops and Pope John Paul II declared to be a schismatic act and grounds for excommunication latae sententiae due to the consecration of four bishops without a papal mandate. Josef Bisig became the fraternity's first superior general.

Organization

, the fraternity included 526 members: 341 priests, 17 deacons, and 168 non-deacon seminarians in 147 dioceses spread among Australia, Austria, Benin, Canada, Colombia, Czech Republic, France, Germany, Great Britain, Ireland, Italy, Mexico, Nigeria, Poland, Switzerland, the United States, and Vietnam. The fraternity's membership represents 35 nationalities, and the average age of its members is 38. , the lay Confraternity of Saint Peter had 8,399 members enrolled, who spiritually support the fraternity's charism.

Superiors general
The FSSP's current superior general is Andrzej Komorowski, who was elected in 2018. Former superior general include:
 Josef Bisig (1988–2000)
 Arnaud Devillers (2000–2006)
 John Berg (2006–2018)

Provinces, districts and regions
The fraternity is divided into four districts:
 German-speaking District, Superior: Stefan Dreher
 French District, Superior: Benoît Paul-Joseph
 North American Province, Provincial: William Lawrence
 Oceania District, Superior: Michael McCaffrey

Educational institutions
The fraternity has two seminaries:
 The International Seminary of St. Peter in Wigratzbad-Opfenbach, in the German state of Bavaria (Diocese of Augsburg), was established in 1988. It serves French and German-speaking seminarians. Its current rector is Fr. Vincent Ribeton.
 Our Lady of Guadalupe Seminary, in Denton, Nebraska, United States (Diocese of Lincoln), was established in 1994 and serves English-speaking seminarians. Its current rector is Fr. Josef Bisig.

Ezekiel House, a house of formation for first-year seminarians, exists in the city of Sydney, Australia. The Director of Ezechiel House is Fr. Duncan Wong.

In 2015, the fraternity established in Guadalajara, Mexico, Casa Cristo Rey, an apostolate which it plans to develop into a house of formation for first-year seminarians for native Spanish-speaking postulants. Presently, Casa Cristo Rey serves as a priestly discernment program for young men from Spain and Latin America. In 2016 Casa Cristo Rey opened the Junipero Serra Spanish Institute, a program offering six or eight weeks of Spanish immersion for priests and seminarians.

Until 2012, the fraternity also operated an American boarding school: St. Gregory's Academy in Elmhurst, Pennsylvania.

See also

George Gabet
Antony Sumich

Notes

References

External links

 Priestly Fraternity of St. Peter – International website with pages in English, French, German, Spanish, Portuguese, Italian, Polish, and Latin
 Organizational chart of FSSP leadership
 Documents relating to the foundation of the FSSP
 Confraternity of Saint Peter (Lay associate members of the FSSP)
 Our Lady of Guadalupe Seminary
 The Seminary of Wigratzbad
 Saint Gregory's Academy

 
Societies of apostolic life
Traditionalist Catholicism
Catholic organizations established in the 20th century
Communities using the Tridentine Mass
Christian organizations established in 1988